"Burning Like a Flame" is a song by American heavy metal band Dokken, released in 1987 on the album Back for the Attack. The song peaked at number 20 on the Album Rock Tracks chart and at number 72 on the Billboard Hot 100 in the United States.

Track listing
7" single

UK 12" single

European 12" single

Charts

References

1987 singles
Dokken songs
1987 songs
Elektra Records singles
Songs written by Don Dokken
Songs written by George Lynch (musician)
Songs written by Jeff Pilson